Uraí is a municipality in the state of Paraná in the Southern Region of Brazil.

Brazilian World Cup winning footballer Kleberson was born in Uraí.

See also
List of municipalities in Paraná

References

Municipalities in Paraná